Ivana Abramović (born 3 September 1983) is a retired Croatian tennis player.

Her career-high WTA rankings are 143 in singles, achieved on 12 January 2004, and 141 in doubles, set on 29 January 2007. Her younger sister Maria Abramović also played tennis on ITF Women's Circuit and WTA Tour.

Abramović qualified for the singles draw at the 2006 Wimbledon Championships, and lost to eventual champion Amélie Mauresmo in the first round.

ITF finals

Singles (2–5)

Doubles (7–11)

References

External links
 
 
 

1983 births
Living people
Croatian female tennis players
Universiade medalists in tennis
Tennis players from Zagreb
Universiade bronze medalists for Croatia
Medalists at the 2007 Summer Universiade
21st-century Croatian women